Kutluğ  is a common masculine Turkish given name. In Turkish, "Kutluğ" means "holy", "hooly", and/or "blessed".

Given name
 Aşina Kutluğ, the founder of the Second Eastern Turkic Khaganate.
 Kutlug Yabghu Qaghan, a ruler of the Second Eastern Turkic Khaganate.
 Kutluğ Ataman, a Turkish filmmaker and contemporary artist.
 Kutlug I Bilge Kagan, a founder of Uyghur Khaganate (744 CE)
 Qutlugh Khwaja
 Qutlugh bin Tur Ali

Turkish masculine given names